Allied Plaza is a shopping mall located at the intersection of Nathan Road and Nullah Road in Mong Kok, Yau Tsim Mong District, Hong Kong next to Prince Edward station.

References

Mong Kok
Shopping centres in Hong Kong